Perambur Loco Works is a suburban railway station in the Perambur area of the city of Chennai, in Tamil Nadu, in India. It serves the Integral Coach Factory (ICF) that is one of the largest railroad carriage and locomotive manufacturers in the world. The station serves growing areas like Periyar Nagar and Jawahar Nagar localities in the north-west corner of Chennai. The station has an elevation of 7.01 m above sea level.

History

Perambur Loco Works is one of the three railway workshops serving Indian Railways' Southern Railway zone (the other two being the Perambur Carriage Works in Chennai and the Golden Rock Railway Workshop at Tiruchi). The Perambur region has been a part of the Chennai city since the middle of the 18th century. The Southern Railway's workshop located here was established in the year 1856 to serve the erstwhile Madras and Southern Mahratta (M&SM) Railway Company and was one of the first major industrial units of the early-20th-century Madras. It was a combined locomotive, carriage and wagon POH, and coach-building workshop and was later bifurcated, in 1932, to deal with carriage and wagon POH activity only, shifting the locomotive overhaul activity to the new Loco workshop which was built adjacent to the original workshop. These two workshops are served by Perambur Carriage Works and Perambur Loco Works stations, respectively. In 1951, the Southern Railway was formed by integrating the erstwhile South Indian Railway Company (Madras), the Southern Mahratta Railway Company, and Mysore State Railway with all their workshops and assets. The project 'subway to the platforms' was completed in mid-2019.

The lines at the station were electrified on 29 November 1979, with the electrification of the Chennai Central–Tiruvallur section.

See also
 Chennai Suburban Railway
 Integral Coach Factory
 Regional Railway Museum
 Railway stations in Chennai

References

External link 

Geohack

Stations of Chennai Suburban Railway
Railway stations in Chennai